Veaceslav Semionov (16 March 1956 – 13 October 2020) was a Moldavian professional football manager and former footballer. He was born in Bender.

For four spells he was the head coach of Moldavian football club FC Dacia Chişinău.

References

External links
 Veaceslav Semionov at soccerway (as manager)
 

1956 births
2020 deaths
People from Bender, Moldova
Soviet footballers
Moldovan footballers
FC Zimbru Chișinău players
CSF Bălți players
FC Tighina players
Association football defenders
Moldovan football managers
FC Dacia Chișinău managers
Moldovan Super Liga managers